Sergey Smirnov (born 19 January 1961) is a Soviet rower. He competed in the men's coxless four event at the 1988 Summer Olympics.

References

External links
 

1961 births
Living people
Soviet male rowers
Olympic rowers of the Soviet Union
Rowers at the 1988 Summer Olympics
Place of birth missing (living people)